Zhou Jian (born March 1968) is a Chinese diplomat currently serving as ambassador of China to Qatar.

Biography
Zhou was born in Gushi County, Henan, in March 1968. In 1992 he entered the Renmin University of China, majoring in history, where he graduated in 1995. After university, he was assigned to the Department of Asian Affairs of the Ministry of Foreign Affairs of the People's Republic of China. In 1999 he was a secretary in Chinese Embassy in the Republic of Singapore. In 2002 he was appointed as deputy director of the Department of Policy Planning of Foreign Affairs of the People's Republic of China, and 4 years later promoted to the Director position. On July 18, 2019, he was appointed ambassador of China to Qatar, replacing Li Chen.

References

1968 births
Renmin University of China alumni
Living people
Ambassadors of China to Qatar